Harje is a village in the Municipality of Laško in eastern Slovenia. It lies south of Laško in the valley of a minor left tributary of the Savinja River.  The area is part of the traditional region of Styria. It is now included with the rest of the municipality in the Savinja Statistical Region.

References

External links
Harje on Geopedia

Populated places in the Municipality of Laško